Prison sans barreaux is a 1938 French film directed by Léonide Moguy.  It was set in a reformatory for young girls.

It won the Bienelle at the Venice Film Festival and was remade by Alex Korda.

Cast
Annie Ducaux
Roger Duchesne
Ginette Leclerc
Corinne Luchaire

References

External links

Film page at BFI

1938 films
Films directed by Léonide Moguy
French drama films
1930s French-language films
1938 drama films
French black-and-white films
1930s French films